New Jersey Public Radio (NJPR) is an NPR member network serving portions of northern New Jersey on four licensed stations: 88.1 WNJT-FM in Trenton, 88.5 WNJP in Sussex, 89.3 WNJY in Netcong, and 90.3 WNJO (FM) in Toms River, which were the four northernmost radio stations of the New Jersey Network (NJN) until 2011.  NJPR is owned by New York Public Radio (NYPR), which also owns the two WNYC and two WQXR-FM stations.

Overview

The seeds which led to the formation of New Jersey Public Radio were planted in 2008, when NJN officials asked the New Jersey Legislature for permission to explore the possibility of spinning-off into a non-profit entity, independent from state funding.  However, on June 6, 2011, New Jersey governor Chris Christie, who vowed to end state-funded public broadcasting upon taking office in 2010, announced the sale of the radio network.  The northern part of the network was sold to New York Public Radio, which used the stations to start a new New Jersey-focused public radio network. A formal agreement was signed on June 29.  NYPR assumed control of the stations under a management agreement on July 1; the Federal Communications Commission approved the sale on August 29, 2011.

Programming
Originally, New Jersey Public Radio's programming was largely identical to the programming that had been offered by NJN; consisting primarily of national programming from NPR, Public Radio Exchange, and American Public Media, as well as a simulcast of WBGO's jazz programming in the overnight hours.

On January 12, 2012; NJPR rolled out a new schedule.  Among the highlights were a local host for Morning Edition and increased New Jersey-centric news and information content in partnership with the New Jersey News Service, headquartered at Montclair State University.

Stations
Due to the crowded state of the noncommercial end of the FM dial in the northeastern United States, the four New Jersey Public Radio stations all operate at relatively low power.  None has an ERP greater than 4,000 watts.

All four NJPR stations were knocked off the air on October 29, 2012 after Hurricane Sandy.  While WNJY, WNJP and WNJT returned to the air by November 3, it took until December 14 to get WNJO back on the air as its transmitter is located near Seaside Park on the Barnegat Peninsula, which was inaccessible from mainland New Jersey for some time after the storm.  New York Public Radio engineering director Jim Stagnitto initially feared that the WNJO transmitter was knocked into Barnegat Bay, but found it intact when his team was able to access the site.

References

External links

Radio stations established in 2011
NPR member networks
New York Public Radio